The Al-Tahera Church (Arabic: كنيسة الطاهرة القلعة) is a partially demolished Syriac Catholic church in Mosul, Iraq.

History 
The current building was constructed between 1859 and 1862, replacing an adjacent ancient church. The church was partially destroyed by ISIL during its campaign to destroy cultural heritage during 2014–2017. A reconstruction effort was organized by UNESCO with support of the United Arab Emirates to rebuild the church.

References 

Churches in Mosul
Syriac Catholic church buildings
Buildings and structures destroyed by ISIL